Thugs Are Us is the fourth studio album by American rapper Trick Daddy. It was released on March 20, 2001 via Slip-N-Slide/Atlantic Records. Production was handled by Righteous Funk Boogie, The Committee, Black Mob Group, Jim Jonsin, J-Roc, Mr. Charlie, Roc, Saint Benson, and Styles, with Ted Lucas serving as executive producer. It features guest appearances from Duece Poppito, Tre+6, JoVaughn "J.V." Clark, Trina, Society, Kase and Migraine.

The album debuted at number 4 on the US Billboard 200 with 116,000 copies sold in the first week released. Its lead single, "Take It to da House" peaked at number 50 on the Billboard Hot 100, while its second single, "I'm a Thug", reached number 17 on the Billboard Hot 100, making it the rapper's second highest charting single. The album has also been platinum by the Recording Industry Association of America with an excess of 1.8 million copies sold, making it Trick Daddy's best selling CD. The album is now out of print.

Track listing

Sample credits
Track 2 contains a sample of "Cheatin Is" performed by Millie Jackson
Track 5 contains excerpts from "The Boss" performed by James Brown, and "Boogie Shoes" performed by KC and the Sunshine Band
Track 9 contains a sample of "Dance to the Drummer's Beat" as performed by Herman Kelly and Life

Charts

Weekly charts

Year-end charts

Certifications

References

External links

2001 albums
Trick Daddy albums
Atlantic Records albums